The Chromebit is a stick PC running Google's ChromeOS. It is able to be plugged into any display via HDMI to act as a personal computer. Keyboards and mice are able to be connected over Bluetooth or Wi-Fi. The device was announced in April 2015 and began shipping November 2015.

Functionality 
A Chromebit uses a display with an HDMI port to control a desktop variant of the Chromebook netbook , which runs Google's ChromeOS operating system. ChromeOS primarily supports a single application, a web browser, thereby relying heavily on an Internet connection for software functionality and data storage.

Chromebits have a superficial resemblance to the Chromecast, another Google device. But whereas the Chromecast is designed to display multimedia and web content from an Android or Chrome OS device on a television or other large-screen display, the Chromebit is a self-contained personal computer. The device competes against the Intel Compute Stick, which offers similar plug-in functionality using two other operating systems, Windows 8.1 and  Windows 10 .

Technology 
Internally, the first Chromebit resembles a standard Chromebook laptop. The device features 802.11ac Wi-Fi and Bluetooth 4.0, as well as a USB 2.0 port at one end. The other end swivels, enabling it to fit into a variety of HDMI slots. The Chromebit has a total RAM capacity of 2 gigabytes and 16 gigabytes of flash memory.

Availability and models 
Google announced the Chromebit on March 31, 2015. Google and Asus began shipping the first model that November. The Chromebit no longer received updates after November 2020.

References 

Cloud clients
Google hardware
Products introduced in 2015
Google Chrome
Personal computers